Illuminate is an album by a quartet co-led by jazz guitarist Joe Morris and  alto saxophonist Rob Brown, which was recorded in 1993 and released on Leo Lab, a sublabel of Leo Records.
Rehearsing and recording this album was the first time the quartet worked together as a band, although Morris played with Brown before on Youniverse and the trio without Morris recorded High Wire.

Reception

In his review for AllMusic, Thom Jurek says about the album that "it's a challenging and deeply satisfying set of music by a short-lived but gifted quartet." The Penguin Guide to Jazz states "the defining characteristic of the music on Illuminate is the responsiveness of the player to one another."

Track listing
 "Results" (Morris, Brown, Parker, Krall) – 11:52
 "Illuminate" (Joe Morris) – 7:11 
 "Inklings" (Rob Brown) – 23:01 
 "Pivotal" (Morris, Brown, Parker, Krall) – 11:13

Personnel
Joe Morris - guitar
Rob Brown – alto sax
William Parker – bass
Jackson Krall – drums

References

1995 albums
Joe Morris (guitarist) albums
Rob Brown (saxophonist) albums
Leo Records albums
Collaborative albums